Tanybria is a genus of leaf beetles in the subfamily Eumolpinae. It is distributed in Africa.

However, this name was unavailable, as it was preoccupied by Eubrachis as first used by Dejean in his catalogue in 1836 (as an unnecessary replacement name for Pseudocolaspis), and Eubrachis in the sense of Joseph Sugar Baly in 1878 (now a synonym of Macrocoma). Because of this, Burgeon's Eubrachis was renamed to Tanybria by Brian J. Selman in 1963.

Species
 Tanybria apicalis (Jacoby, 1881)
 Tanybria aurichalcea (J. Thomson, 1858)
 Tanybria bipilis (Burgeon, 1940)
 Tanybria costata (Jacoby, 1898)
 Tanybria cupreomarginata (Jacoby, 1895)
 Tanybria eximia (Baly, 1877)
 Tanybria kivuensis (Burgeon, 1940)
 Tanybria spinipes (Baly, 1878)
 Tanybria timiliatha (J. Thomson, 1858)
 Tanybria tuberculata (Jacoby, 1903)

References

Eumolpinae
Chrysomelidae genera
Beetles of Africa